Asymphorodes bipunctatus is a moth of the family Agonoxenidae. Found in French Polynesia, it was described by John Frederick Gates Clarke in 1986.

References

Moths described in 1986
Agonoxeninae
Moths of Oceania
Endemic fauna of French Polynesia